The following is a list of massacres that have occurred in Ethiopia (numbers may be approximate):

References 

Ethiopia
Massacres

Massacres